Soerjopranoto (EYD: Suryopranoto; 11 January 1871 – 15 October 1959) was an Indonesian politician and labor leader. He founded and lead the Personeel Fabriek Bond (PFB), a labor union associated with the Sarekat Islam movement, of which he was a member of from 1915 to 1933. He was dubbed "The Strike King" by the Dutch press for his involvement in the labor movement. He was also the elder brother of Ki Hajar Dewantara, a pro-independence activist and nationalist. Following his death, Soerjopranoto was proclaimed a national hero by President Sukarno.

See also 

 Ki Hajar Dewantara, his brother.

References

Citations

Sources 

 
 

1871 births
1959 deaths
Indonesian trade unionists
National Heroes of Indonesia
People from Yogyakarta